Kosilovo is a rural locality in Verkhnekhotemlsky Selsoviet Rural Settlement, Fatezhsky District, Kursk Oblast, Russia. Population:

Geography 
The village is located on the Umsky Brook in the basin of the Svapa, 103 km from the Russia–Ukraine border, 34 km north-west of Kursk, 10.5 km south-east of the district center – the town Fatezh, 4.5 km from the selsoviet center – Verkhny Khoteml.

 Climate
Kosilovo has a warm-summer humid continental climate (Dfb in the Köppen climate classification).

Transport 
Kosilovo is located 1.5 km from the federal route  Crimea Highway as part of the European route E105, 24 km from the road of regional importance  (Kursk – Ponyri), 3 km from the road  (Fatezh – 38K-018), on the road of intermunicipal significance  (M2 "Crimea Highway" – Kosilovo, with the access road to Dobrokhotovo), 28 km from the nearest railway halt 521 km (railway line Oryol – Kursk).

The rural locality is situated 36 km from Kursk Vostochny Airport, 156 km from Belgorod International Airport and 227 km from Voronezh Peter the Great Airport.

References

Notes

Sources

Rural localities in Fatezhsky District